Wilhelm Busch was a German caricaturist, painter, and poet of the 19th and early 20th century.

Wilhelm Busch may also refer to:
Wilhelm Busch (surgeon), German physician of the 19th century
Willy Busch, German footballer of the interwar period of the 20th century
Wilhelm Busch (pastor), German Lutheran pastor, youth evangelist, writer and activist during the Nazi period in Germany
Wilhelm Busch (historian) (1861–1929), German historian who specialised in English history, in particular on the Tudors

See also
Wilhelm Busch Museum
Wilhelm Busch Prize